Andrew Gowers (born 11 April 1969) is  a former Australian rules footballer who played for Hawthorn and Brisbane in the wing position. Gowers played in Hawthorn's 1991 AFL Grand Final victory.

A former Xavier College student, he was part of their 1st XVIII in 1986 that won both the Associated Public Schools premiership, as well as the coveted Herald Shield Cup.

Football administration
On 16 December 2013, Gowers, was appointed to the Hawthorn Football Club board. He will take on the role of Football Director.

Gowers was elected as the president of the Hawthorn Football Club by its members on the 13th of December 2022.

References

External links

Australian rules footballers from Victoria (Australia)
1969 births
Living people
Hawthorn Football Club players
Hawthorn Football Club Premiership players
Hawthorn Football Club administrators
Brisbane Bears players
Brisbane Lions players
Old Xaverians Football Club players
People educated at Xavier College
One-time VFL/AFL Premiership players